Andrzej Bledzewski (born 2 July  1977) is a Polish retired footballer who played as a goalkeeper. He currently serves as a goalkeeping coach for GKS Tychy.

Career

Club
In February 2011, he joined Warta Poznań.

In July 2011, he joined Miedź Legnica.

International
He appeared in one match for the Poland national football team.

References

External links
 
 

1977 births
Living people
Sportspeople from Gdynia
Polish footballers
Poland international footballers
Poland youth international footballers
Association football goalkeepers
Ekstraklasa players
I liga players
Arka Gdynia players
Górnik Łęczna players
Górnik Zabrze players
Polonia Bytom players
Bałtyk Gdynia players
Birkirkara F.C. players
Warta Poznań players
Miedź Legnica players